Live at Madison Square Garden is a fifth concert video by American band Bon Jovi from the last North American part of their Lost Highway Tour. It was recorded on July 14 and July 15, 2008, at Madison Square Garden. It was directed by Anthony Bongiovi and Brian Lockwood. It was  released on DVD and Blu-ray on November 20, 2009, in Europe and Australia; November 23, 2009, in the UK; November 25, 2009, in Japan; and May 11, 2010, in the US and Canada.

Track listing

Blu-ray edition
The Blu-ray edition features as an exclusive bonus feature the documentary When We Were Beautiful directed by Phil Griffin,
that follows the band through their 2007/08 Lost Highway Tour.

Technical notes
The European release of the concert video on a DVD and Blu-ray is in the PAL picture format and American release will have NTSC picture format. The sound is in 5.1 Dolby Digital Surround and in classic stereo.

Personnel
 Jon Bon Jovi – lead vocals, guitar
 Richie Sambora – lead guitar, backing vocals, talkbox
 Hugh McDonald – bass, backing vocals
 Tico Torres – drums, percussion
 David Bryan – keyboards, backing vocals

with
 Bobby Bandiera – rhythm guitar, backing vocals
 Lorenza Ponce – violin, backing vocals

Charts

References

2009 video albums
Bon Jovi video albums
Live video albums
2009 live albums
Albums recorded at Madison Square Garden